Work It Out is the eighth studio album by American alternative rock band Caroline's Spine. The album's second track, "The Light Inside," served as the album's lead single in late 2008.

In 2008, Newquist recorded Work It Out in Austin, Texas and  Scottsdale, Arizona. Newquist serves as the only original band member featured on the album and worked with Nick DiDia to create the "melodic train wreck." The lead single, "The Light Inside," found national radio play in late 2008 and would rank as the second most downloaded song in Caroline's Spine's history, placing it just under their biggest hit, "Sullivan."

A US tour in promotion of Work It Out began on August 31, 2008, and continued into 2009 with concerts in North America and Europe.

Track listing
 "Work It Out" - 3:21
 "The Light Inside" - 3:27
 "Take My Heart" - 3:32
 "What I Like" - 3:14
 "Alone With You" - 3:52
 "Bombs Away" - 3:28
 "Seed to Sow" - 3:36
 "When You Go" - 3:57

Band Lineup
Jimmy Newquist - vocals, guitar, keys
Matt McHan - guitar
Jeff Rambo - bass guitar
Dave Kendziora - drums

References

2008 albums
Caroline's Spine albums